Dean Galt (born 13 February 1971) is a retired male badminton player from New Zealand.

Career
Galt competed in badminton at the 1992 Summer Olympics in men's singles. He lost in the first round to Chris Jogis, of the United States, 15–1, 15–3.

He represented New Zealand in the 1994 Commonwealth Games, and the 1998 Commonwealth Games where he was one of the men's team that won a bronze.

References

External links
Profile at NZOC website

1971 births
Living people
New Zealand male badminton players
Badminton players at the 1992 Summer Olympics
Olympic badminton players of New Zealand
Badminton players at the 1994 Commonwealth Games
Badminton players at the 1998 Commonwealth Games
Commonwealth Games bronze medallists for New Zealand
Commonwealth Games medallists in badminton
Medallists at the 1998 Commonwealth Games